Dagaga may refer to:
Degagah (disambiguation), places in Iran
Fataluku language